Dan River may refer to:

 Dan River
 Dan River (China)
 Dan River (Israel)

Other 
 Little Dan River
 Browns Dan River
 Dan Hole River

See also 
 Dan (disambiguation)
 Valea lui Dan River